Sally Ann Laird (2 May 1956 – 15 July 2010) was a British editor and translator who specialised in Russian literature.

Biography
Laird studied at Oxford University and Harvard University, where she gained an MA in Soviet studies in 1981.

Laird was USSR editor for the magazine Index on Censorship between June 1986 and November 1988, when she became editor in chief. She held the job until August 1989. After leaving the magazine she worked as a translator and editor. She translated a series of Russian novels. Later she co-authored Till my Tale is Told: Women’s Memoirs of the Gulag and wrote Voices of Russian Literature: Interviews with Ten Contemporary Writers.

In 1993, Laird moved to Denmark. Laird and her husband Mark Le Fanu had one daughter.

External links
Tribute at Index on Censorship

1956 births
2010 deaths
Alumni of the University of Oxford
Harvard University alumni
British editors
British women editors
Russian–English translators
20th-century British translators
British women writers
20th-century women writers